Stationery refers to commercially manufactured writing materials, including cut paper, envelopes, writing implements, continuous form paper, and other office supplies. Stationery includes materials to be written on by hand (e.g., letter paper) or by equipment such as computer printers.

History of stationery
Originally, the term 'stationery' referred to all products sold by a stationer, whose name indicated that his book shop was on a fixed spot. This was usually somewhere near a university, and permanent, while medieval trading was mainly carried on by itinerant peddlers (including chapmen, who sold books) and others (such as farmers and craftsmen) at markets and fairs. It was a unique term used between the 13th and 15th centuries in the manuscript culture. Stationers' shops were places where books were bound, copied, and published. These shops often loaned books to nearby university students for a fee. The books were loaned out in sections, allowing students to study or copy them, and the only way to get the next part of the book was to return the previous section. In some cases, stationers' shops became the preferred choice for scholars to find books, instead of university libraries due to stationers' shops' wider collection of books. The Stationers' Company formerly held a monopoly over the publishing industry in England and was responsible for copyright regulations.

Uses of stationery

Printing
Printing is the process of applying a colouring agent to a surface to create a body of text or illustrations. This is often achieved through printing technology, but can be done by hand using more traditional methods. The earliest form of printing is wood blocking.

Letterpress

Letterpress is a process of printing several identical copies that presses words and designs onto the page. The print may be inked or blind, but is typically done in a single color. Motifs or designs may be added as many letterpress machines use movable plates that must be hand-set. Letterpress printing remained the primary method of printing until the 19th century.

Single documents

When a single document needs to be produced, it may be handwritten or printed, typically by a computer printer. Several copies of one original paper can be produced by some printers using multipart stationery. Typing with a typewriter is largely obsolete, having been superseded for most purposes by preparing a document with a word processor and then printing it.

Thermographic

Thermographic printing is a process that involves several stages but can be implemented in a low-cost manufacturing process. The process involves printing the desired designs or text with an ink that remains wet, rather than drying on contact with the paper. The paper is then dusted with a powdered polymer that adheres to the ink. The paper is vacuumed or agitated, mechanically or by hand, to remove excess powder, and then heated to near combustion. The wet ink and polymer bond and dry, resulting in a raised print surface similar to the result of an engraving process.

Embossing

Embossing is a printing technique used to create raised surfaces in the converted paper stock. The process relies upon mated dies that press the paper into a shape that can be observed on both the front and back surfaces. Two things are required during the process of embossing: a die and a stock. The result is a three-dimensional (3D) effect that emphasizes a particular area of the design.

Engraving

Engraving is a process that requires a design to be cut into a plate made of relatively hard material. The metal plate is first polished so that the design cut can be easily visible to the person. This technology has a long history and requires a significant amount of skill, experience, and expertise. The finished plate is usually covered in ink, and then the ink is removed from all of the un-etched portions of the plate. The plate is then pressed into paper under substantial pressure. The result is a design that is slightly raised on the surface of the paper and covered in ink. Due to the cost of the process and expertise required, many consumers opt for thermographic printing, a process that results in a similarly raised print surface, but through different means at less cost.

Classifications 

Business Stationery: Business card, letterhead, invoices, receipts
Desktop instruments: hole punch, stapler and staples, tapes and tape dispensers,
Drawing instruments: brushes, pens, colour pencils, crayons, water colour,
Erasers
Ink and toner:
Dot matrix printer's ink ribbon
Inkjet cartridge
Laser printer toner
Photocopier toner
Filing and storage:
Expandable file
File folder
Hanging file folder
Index cards and files
Two-pocket portfolios
Mailing and shipping supplies:
Envelope
Paper and pad:
Notebooks, wirebound notebook, writing pads, college ruled paper, wide-ruled paper,
Office paper: dot matrix paper, inkjet printer paper, laser printer paper, photocopy paper.
Loose leaves and ring binders.
Writing instruments: ballpoint pen, fountain pen, pencil, porous point pen, rollerball pen, highlighter pen

School supplies
Many shops that sell stationery also sell other school supplies for students in primary and secondary education, including pocket calculators, display boards, compasses and protractors, lunchboxes, and the like.

See also
 Office supplies
 List of stationery topics
 New Zealand standard for school stationery

References

External links

 
Office equipment
لوازم تحریر